is a Japanese former volleyball player who competed in the 1992 Summer Olympics.

References

1964 births
Living people
Japanese men's volleyball players
Olympic volleyball players of Japan
Volleyball players at the 1992 Summer Olympics
Asian Games medalists in volleyball
Volleyball players at the 1990 Asian Games
Medalists at the 1990 Asian Games
Asian Games bronze medalists for Japan
20th-century Japanese people